The Baringo Half Marathon is an annual road running competition for men and women over the half marathon distance which takes place every December in Baringo, Kenya. The programme previously had a 15 kilometres race for women, but this was extended to a half marathon in 2011.

The race was established in 2001 by Paul Tergat, a former marathon world record holder, who was born in the local area. Tergat hoped that the race would unearth and nurture high quality runners in the area. It tends to attract around 500 (mostly Kenyan) runners, among them a number of world-class road racing athletes.

The course of the road race features many curves and multiple uphill and downhill sections. Mubarak Hassan Shami became the first runner to defend the title, and Agnes Kiprop became the first woman to win the competition twice consecutively. The race received greater commercial support in 2009, attracting sponsorship deals with Safaricom and the National Social Security Fund. Around 300 runners took part in the 2010 men's half marathon race.

The men's event was changed to a 20 kilometres road race in 2006 and 2007, but it returned to its original half marathon format in 2008 with the 20 km races not considered to be within the editions of the race.

Past winners

Key:

References

Half marathons
Athletics competitions in Kenya
Recurring sporting events established in 2001
Baringo County
Sport in Rift Valley Province
2001 establishments in Kenya